Dand is an unincorporated community in southwestern Manitoba, Canada. It is located approximately 17 kilometers (10 miles) north of Deloraine, Manitoba, within the former Rural Municipality of Winchester and now Municipality of Deloraine - Winchester.

References 

Unincorporated communities in Westman Region